Killa Saifullah’s racerunner (Eremias killasaifullahi) is a species of lizard found in Iran.

References

Eremias
Reptiles described in 2022